= Monen =

Kabbalistic concept

Monen is a kabbalistic concept covering that branch of occultism which deals with the reading of the future by the computation of time and observation of planets and stars (astrology).
